Appetite (stylized as APPETITE) was a gallery and artist-run space, founded by Daniela Luna, in the neighborhood of San Telmo, Buenos Aires, Argentina. Its mission was to showcase and promote new artists. It sometimes courted controversy, before closing in mid-2011.

History
Appetite was created in 2005 by Daniela Luna. It generated considerable interest in the neighborhood of San Telmo, transforming its area into a prominent contemporary art district of Buenos Aires. Appetite also inspired young artists to open their own spaces.

It quickly became known for its new artists and its openings and parties. As described by the New York Times, it was "an irreverent, punk-inflected gallery in San Telmo started by Daniela Luna, a feisty 30-year-old known for her shrewd eye and cool parties." 

In mid-2010 Appetite closed the doors of its three Buenos Aires spaces, as Daniela Luna moved to Beijing, China.

Overseas presence

New York
In 2008 and 2009 Appetite had a branch in Bushwick, Brooklyn, where it organized exhibitions and events. It had appearances in New York art fairs, like Pinta Art Show, where The New York Times pointed: "For once, a fair looks like an art exhibition, not a job-lot display. And when a booth is crowded, the pieces can be blamed, as is the case at Appetite, a gallery with branches in Buenos Aires and Brooklyn that shows young artists working in an accumulative mode."

London
Appetite was the first Argentinian gallery to be accepted at Frieze Art Fair, where it was one of the stands that received more attention from the press and public, and generated controversies by their approach to the global economic crisis as subject for the stand.
While The New York Times pointed: "With first-time exhibitors from China, Turkey, India and Argentina (from Buenos Aires, Appetite, where the work of about 10 artists is displayed in a kind of continuous trash heap), Frieze still managed to provide a random snapshot of an increasingly global and youthful art world in transition."

Vilnius
Appetite was invited to participate in the fair Art Vilnius 09, that year Vilnius was named European Capital of Culture, and this was one of the main events organized. The Appetite stand was nominated for best stand. While being in that city, Daniela Luna also made a performance at the Vilnius Graphic Art Center and a video screening from Argentinian artists.

Milan
In April 2008 it was part of the group of galleries presented to the fair MiArt by the name of FOCUS BUENOS AIRES. 
Local newspaper La Nación announced: (From Spanish) "With consortium format and cooperative spirit, a group of Buenos Aires galleries with the support of the minister of culture, Hernán Lombardi, and the curatorship of Adriana Forconi and Florencia Braga Menéndez, celebrated the opening of MiArt edition 13th."
APPETITE participation at this fair was pointed by the New York Times as well: "Appetite gallery will get additional exposure in Milan when the contemporary art fair, MiArt 2008, spotlights emerging Buenos Aires artists in April. Adriana Forconi, a jet-settling consultant to the art fair, was in town recently to scout for worthy galleries, and was struck by what she calls the city’s 'frenetic and blissfully chaotic' pace."

Beijing
In March 2011 Daniela Luna opened an Appetite space in Beijing, China, at 798 Art Zone, and later in November moved to Caochangdi, the two main art zones of that city, where she organized and curated exhibitions and performance projects by artists from different nationalities. She also worked between Beijing and Hong Kong on research and writing about Chinese art. Part of this research can be seen as a four pages spread published by Argentinian magazine DMag.

Side projects

War Club
War Club is an underground party that started in 2008, in a secret warehouse that guests could access with a password, and it mixed underground DJs and bands, with site specific art interventions and performance.
As described at Time Out, "Arty meets party at Daniela Luna's WarClub. Surrounded by cutting edge wall art, intellectuals and club kids, artists and collectors, the young and the old make up an eclectic smiling crowd. WarClub is the brainchild of enfant terrible art gallerist Daniela Luna. It has taken place, up until now, in this raw, industrial, multi-room space whose only modifications, in the punk spirit Luna most prizes, are an accumulation of graffiti, murals and installations."

Tanto Deseo
Tanto Deseo is a concept store and exhibition space for erotic art and objects that has functioned in the area of San Telmo since 2006.
Many media celebrated this initiative, Les Inrockuptibles published an issue completely about sex, of which Tanto Deseo was the cover story and spread throughout the magazine. (From Spanish) "Without any doubt, one of the present oasis is Tanto Deseo, an erotic-artistic branch from APPETITE gallery, mothership of young art commanded by Daniela Luna. Tanto Deseo is an experimental essay, where pulsions are expressed under different topics."
It won the "Revelation Award" at the Puro Diseño fair in 2008. A cultural site, Leedor, talks about it: "Appetite and Tanto Deseo, two galleries with young spirit, that intent to give a space of creation without the market's demands interfering, born from a personal necessity mixed with the feeling that things like these were missing in this city. Participants and winners of the Revelation Award at the fair 'Puro Diseño' some days ago."

Controversies
Appetite was censured or fined in different occasions, mainly due to their usual content of sex, violence, or critics to political and economical issues.

One such controversies took place in 2008 when 10 of the artists abruptly decided to leave the gallery. As told by Clarin, one of the main Argentinian newspapers: (from Spanish) "Personality cult or misunderstanding? For Luna and possibly for the virtuous scene of young artists that she leads, there is an inflection point post-Frieze. By the end of last year, ten of them disassociated themselves from Appetite. While many local media celebrated the gallery's arrival to Frieze, they talked about her curves, her history, and compared her to a diva."  

While Rafael Cippollini, one of the most notable critics from Argentina, resumed at newspaper La Nación (from Spanish) "In a horizon in which the most celebrated references of this first decade are already history, it becomes necessary to revise a peculiar trajectory such as Appetite gallery, in all its brilliant, polemic and flamboyant edges. A meteoric rise, the consequent excessive over expansion - multiple ventures in Buenos Aires, New York, London - and finally, an explosion that led to the dismissal of a substantial part of its staff : the risky and vertiginous bet by Daniela Luna, counter to the cautious times that punctuate our institutions, is as unprecedented and singular in our environment."

References

External links
Official website
Daniela Luna

Art museums and galleries in Argentina
Artist-run centres
Contemporary art galleries in South America
Defunct art museums and galleries
Argentine art
Art galleries established in 2005
Art galleries disestablished in 2010
2005 establishments in Argentina
2010 disestablishments in Argentina